Collin Andrew Samuel CM (born 27 August 1981) is a Trinidad and Tobago former professional footballer who played as a winger or striker. He represented Trinidad and Tobago at senior international level and played in the 2006 World Cup. He played abroad professionally for a number of clubs in Scotland, including Falkirk, Dundee United and St Johnstone, as well as Toronto FC in Canada and Luton Town in England.

Club career

Early career
Samuel began his career with Doc's Khelwalaas of his native Trinidad, where he played from 1998 to 2000. In 2000, he moved to one of the nation's largest clubs, San Juan Jabloteh, where he played the 2001 and 2002 seasons.

Falkirk
Samuel moved to Scotland in August 2002 when he was scouted by Simon Lindsay for Falkirk. He scored 16 goals in 42 appearances in his first season for the then-Scottish First Division side, including a first half hat-trick in a 4–0 Scottish Cup victory against Hearts. During his spell with Falkirk, he had an unsuccessful trial with Everton in the English Premier League.

Dundee United
Samuel moved to Scottish Premier League club Dundee United on 11 July 2003 for £100,000.

Samuel was not as prolific at Tannadice, scoring just 15 goals in total during his four seasons there. Despite scoring on his debut, Samuel managed just one more all season and failed to score at all during 2004–05. Samuel was part of the Dundee United match day squad which participated in the Scottish Cup final in season 2004–05 against Celtic. Despite losing that cup final 1–0, the team still qualified for the following season's UEFA Cup in which Samuel scored against Finnish team, MyPa, at Tannadice in the second leg of the qualifying round tie. Finding his form somewhat that particular season, he managed seven goals, including three in four games during December. In 2006–07, however, Samuel scored five times for United. Generally starting from the bench, he was frequently used as a right midfielder or as a forward. Samuel was told he was free to leave Dundee United at the end of the 2006–07 season, with interest shown by Major League Soccer side Toronto FC and Scottish First Division side, St Johnstone. Samuel subsequently played his last game for Dundee United in their final game of the 2006–07 season, a 0–0 draw at home to Motherwell.

Toronto FC
After being released by Dundee United, media speculation increasingly linked him with moves to a team in the Major League Soccer and the aforementioned St Johnstone. Samuel eventually signed for MLS side Toronto FC, during which time he started every game for the Canadian club, making 19 appearances and scoring three goals for the injury-racked club in their inaugural season. He was released from Toronto FC in April 2008 due to personal reasons, with the club allowed a limited number of international players on their roster.

St Johnstone
Samuel then signed a two-year deal with Scottish First Division side St Johnstone on 6 May 2008 where he proceeded to play no small part in the campaign that led to promotion back to the Scottish Premier League for the 2009–10 season.

Despite being injured for half of the season in St Johnstone's return to the SPL in 2009–10, he still managed seven SPL goals plus one in the cup. He has signed a one-year contract for the 2010–11 campaign, scoring three goals in 36 appearances over the season. He was released at the end of his contract in May 2011.

Later career
Samuel was signed on 31 August 2011, the transfer deadline day, by Luton Town of the English Conference Premier, but left the club by mutual consent after playing one game.

On 20 January 2012, Samuel signed for Scottish Second Division club Arbroath until the end of the 2011–12 season. In the summer of 2012, Samuel moved to East Fife, another Second Division club until the end of the season.

In August 2013, Samuel had a successful trial with Junior outfit Sauchie and signed a contract for the 2013–14 season.

In 2015 he became James Baird's player/assistant manager at Guaya United. In February 2016, he joined North East Stars as a player-coach

Samuel returned to Scotland for work and joined Mill AFC as player/coach.

International career
Samuel played for the Trinidad and Tobago national team, having made his debut on 11 January 2002. He played for the team in the 2002 CONCACAF Gold Cup and was called up to the 2006 World Cup squad. He started the opening group match against Sweden and helped the team earn a goalless draw.

As a member of the squad that competed at the 2006 FIFA World Cup in Germany, Samuel was awarded the Chaconia Medal (Gold Class), the second highest state decoration of Trinidad and Tobago.

Career statistics

Honours
San Juan Jabloteh
 First Citizens Cup: 2000

Falkirk
 Scottish First Division: 2002–03
 Stirlingshire Cup: 2002–03

Dundee United
 Scottish Cup Runner-up: 2004–05
 Forfarshire Cup: 2004–05

St Johnstone
 Scottish First Division: 2008–09

Arbroath
Scottish Second Division: Runner-up 2011–12

Sauchie Juniors
 East of Scotland Cup: 2013–14

Individual
 Chaconia Medal Gold Class: 2006

References

External links

1981 births
Living people
People from Saint Andrew County
Trinidad and Tobago footballers
Trinidad and Tobago international footballers
Association football forwards
San Juan Jabloteh F.C. players
Falkirk F.C. players
Dundee United F.C. players
Toronto FC players
St Johnstone F.C. players
Luton Town F.C. players
Arbroath F.C. players
TT Pro League players
Scottish Football League players
Scottish Premier League players
Major League Soccer players
2002 CONCACAF Gold Cup players
2005 CONCACAF Gold Cup players
2006 FIFA World Cup players
Trinidad and Tobago expatriate footballers
Expatriate footballers in Scotland
Expatriate soccer players in Canada
East Fife F.C. players
Recipients of the Chaconia Medal
Trinidad and Tobago expatriate sportspeople in Canada
Trinidad and Tobago expatriate sportspeople in Scotland